Sila Nerangalil Sila Manithargal may refer to:

 Sila Nerangalil Sila Manithargal (novel), a 1970 novel by Jayakanthan
 Sila Nerangalil Sila Manithargal (1977 film), based on the novel
 Sila Nerangalil Sila Manidhargal (2022 film), unrelated to the novel